Armand-Benoît-Joseph Guffroy (10 November 1742 – 9 February 1801) was a lawyer and politician of the French Revolution.  He was born at Arras and died in Paris, aged 58.

1742 births
1801 deaths
People from Arras
Deputies to the French National Convention
Regicides of Louis XVI